This is a list of some people who were fatally bitten by snakes in the United States by decade in reverse chronological order. It is not a comprehensive list.

Snake species 
The United States has about 30 species of venomous snakes, which include 23 species of rattlesnakes, three species of coral snakes, two species of cottonmouth, and two species of copperhead. At least one species of venomous snake is found in every state except Hawaii, Maine, Rhode Island, and Alaska.

It has been estimated that 7,000–8,000 people per year receive venomous snake bites in the United States, and about five of those people die. Though most fatal bites are attributed to rattlesnakes, the copperhead accounts for more snakebite incidents than any other venomous North American species. Rattlesnake bites, by comparison, are approximately four times as likely to result in a death or major effects as a copperhead bite.

Venomous snakes are distributed unevenly throughout the United States — the vast majority of snake bites occur in warm weather states. States like Florida and Texas have a wide variety and large population of venomous snakes. Bites from venomous snakes are extremely rare in the states near the Canada–US border. Maine, for example, theoretically has only one species (timber rattlesnake); it is rarely seen, and then only in the southern part of the state, and the species is likely extirpated in Maine, with the last sighting in 1901.

21st century

2020s

2010s

2000s

1990s

1980s

1970s

1960s

1950s

1940s

1930s

1920s

1910s

1900s

18th and 19th century

See also
Snakes:
Snakebite
Venomous snakes
List of dangerous snakes
Snake handling in Christianity
Epidemiology of snakebites

Other animals:
List of fatal bear attacks in North America
List of fatal cougar attacks in North America
List of fatal shark attacks in the United States
List of fatal alligator attacks in the United States
List of wolf attacks in North America
Fatal dog attacks in the United States

References

External links

Southeastern Outdoors – Fatal Rattlesnake Bites
Venomous Snakebites in the United States: Management Review and Update from American Family Physician website

Lists
Lists of deaths due to animal attacks in the United States